The Degus are a group of octodontid rodents in the Octodontidae family, but historically referred to the common degu (O. degus).

Degus are placed in two genera:

 Genus Octodon
 O. bridgesi, Bridges's degu, found in Argentina and Chile
 O. degus, the common degu, historically referred to as just "degu", found in central Chile
 O. lunatus, the moon-toothed degu, a nocturnal animal found in central Chile
 O. pacificus, the Mocha Island degu or Pacific degu, a recently discovered species found exclusively on Mocha Island, Chile
Genus Octodontomys
 O. gliroides, the mountain degu, found in the foothills of the Andes in Argentina, Bolivia and Chile.

Animal common name disambiguation pages